Staroarzamatovo (İśke Arzamat; , Tošto Arzamat) is a rural locality (a village) in Staroarzamatovsky Selsoviet, Mishkinsky District, Bashkortostan, Russia. The population was 570 as of 2010. There are 6 streets.

Geography 
Staroarzamatovo is located 15 km northeast of Mishkino (the district's administrative centre) by road. Malonakaryakovo is the nearest rural locality.

References 

Rural localities in Mishkinsky District